Star Without Light (Spanish: Estrella sin luz) is a 1953 Mexican drama film directed by Ernesto Cortázar and starring Rosa Carmina, Fernando Fernández and Gina Cabrera.

Cast
 Rosa Carmina 
 Fernando Fernández 
 Gina Cabrera 
 Alberto González Rubio 
 Luciano de Pazos 
 Salvador Quiroz 
 Acela Vidaurri
 Fernando Torres 
 Guillermo Bravo Sosa

References

Bibliography 
 María Luisa Amador. Cartelera cinematográfica, 1950-1959. UNAM, 1985.

External links 
 

1953 films
1953 drama films
Mexican drama films
1950s Spanish-language films
Films directed by Ernesto Cortázar
Mexican black-and-white films
1950s Mexican films